Thorpe Park is a theme park to the south of London.

Thorpe Park may also refer to:
 Thorpe Park (The Inbetweeners), an episode of a British sitcom called The Inbetweeners
 Thorpe Park Leeds, a business park in Leeds

See also
 Thorpe Camp, former Royal Air Force barracks for RAF Woodhall Spa
 Thorpe (disambiguation)